{|
|}
The Standard E-1 was an early American Army fighter aircraft, tested in 1917. It was the only pursuit aircraft manufactured by the United States during World War I. It arrived late in World War I, and as a result saw more use in the months following the Armistice than those preceding it.

Design and development
Built by the Standard Aircraft Corporation, the E-1 was an open-cockpit single-place tractor biplane, powered by an 80 hp (60 kW) Le Rhône or 100 hp (75 kW) Gnome rotary engine.

Operational history
It proved unsuitable as a fighter, but 128 were bought as an advanced trainer. Of these, 30 were powered by the Gnome rotary engine of 100 horsepower and 98 were powered by the LeRhone C-9 rotary engine of 80 horsepower. After World War I, three were modified as RPVs.

Operators

United States Army Air Service

Survivors
 A late 1918 E-1 was on display at the National Museum of the United States Air Force in Dayton, Ohio for over 40 years. It was placed on indefinite loan to the Museum by J. B. Petty of Gastonia, North Carolina in 1959. After Mr. Petty passed on, the aircraft was sold at auction by his estate and eventually was obtained by Kermit Weeks and is now part of the collection at Fantasy of Flight in Polk City, Florida.
 A 1918 E-1 is on display at the Shannon Air Museum in Fredericksburg, Virginia. This airframe was found at a florist shop in Dayton, Ohio in the 1950s and restored for display.

Specifications

See also

References
Notes

Bibliography

 Angelucci, Enzo. The Rand McNally Encyclopedia of Military Aircraft, 1914-1980. San Diego, California: The Military Press, 1983. .
 Angelucci, Enzo and Peter Bowers. The American Fighter. Sparkford, UK: Haynes Publishing Group, 1987. .
 Donald, David, ed. "Standard Aircraft." Encyclopedia of World Aircraft. Etobicoke, Ontario: Prospero Books, 1997. .
 Taylor, Michael J. H. Jane's Encyclopedia of Aviation. London: Studio Editions, 1989. .
 United States Air Force Museum Guidebook. Wright-Patterson AFB, Ohio: Air Force Museum Foundation, 1975.

External links

 Standard E-1 in Fantasy of Flight Museum
 aerofiles.com

This page contains material originally created for Standard E-1

Standard Aircraft Corporation aircraft
Biplanes
1910s United States military trainer aircraft
Single-engined tractor aircraft
Aircraft first flown in 1917